Neil Bell (born 4 February 1970) is an English actor, mainly on British television and occasionally in films.

Bell studied drama at Oldham College and has played character roles in such TV series as Buried, Shameless, Murphy's Law, Ideal, City Lights, The Bill and Casualty, and the films 24 Hour Party People (2002), Dead Man's Shoes (2004) and Wait For Me (2023).
. He also had a small role in the acclaimed TV series State of Play, playing the colleague of Polly Walker's character. He has recently had a main role in The Bill playing the role of a killer. In 2010, he had a role in the ITV comedy-drama Married Single Other. He has appeared in Coronation Street, and in 2012, he had a regular role in Downton Abbey as Durrant. In 2013, he appeared in the first series of BBC2's Peaky Blinders as Publican Harry Fenton.  In February 2016, he appeared in the BBC drama series Moving On.

In 2004, he wrote, directed and starred in a biographical play about the Salford-born poet John Cooper Clarke called "36 Hours".

He also in 2007 directed a play at the Contact Theatre in Manchester, entitled "Fair".

In 2016, he directed the biopic of Manchester band Joy Division called "New Dawn Fades" at the Dancehouse Theatre Manchester and in 2017 he directed a play entitled "Old Ground" which centred around the re-opening of the Moors Murders case in the mid-1980s. In 2018, he played the reformer Samuel Bamford in the film Peterloo, directed by Mike Leigh.

In 2020, Bell re-joined the cast of Coronation Street to play the role of gangster Mick Chaney.

Bell played the role of the Sardaukar Bashar in 2021 Denis Villeneuve film Dune. He also played the "Time Grappler" in Star Wars: Andor - a prominent role with no speaking lines.

References

External links
 

1970 births
Living people
21st-century English male actors
English male film actors
Male actors from Oldham
English male soap opera actors
English male stage actors
English theatre directors